Pritchardia kaalae, also known as Waianae Range pritchardia  or loulu palm, is a species of palm tree that is endemic to the western part of the island of Oahu in Hawaii. In 1998 there were fewer than 130 individuals remaining in the wild. This is a federally listed endangered species of the United States.

References

kaalae
Endemic flora of Hawaii
Biota of Oahu
Trees of Hawaii
Waianae Range
Taxonomy articles created by Polbot